The cell cortex, also known as the actin cortex, cortical cytoskeleton or actomyosin cortex, is a specialized layer of cytoplasmic proteins on the inner face of the cell membrane. It functions as a modulator of membrane behavior and cell surface properties. In most eukaryotic cells lacking a cell wall, the cortex is an actin-rich network consisting of F-actin filaments, myosin motors, and actin-binding proteins. The actomyosin cortex is attached to the cell membrane via membrane-anchoring proteins called ERM proteins that plays a central role in cell shape control. The protein constituents of the cortex undergo rapid turnover, making the cortex both mechanically rigid and highly plastic, two properties essential to its function. In most cases, the cortex is in the range of 100 to 1000 nanometers thick.

In some animal cells, the protein spectrin may be present in the cortex. Spectrin helps to create a network by cross-linked actin filaments. The proportions of spectrin and actin vary with cell type. Spectrin proteins and actin microfilaments are attached to transmembrane proteins by attachment proteins between them and the transmembrane proteins. The cell cortex is attached to the inner cytosolic face of the plasma membrane in cells where the spectrin proteins and actin microfilaments form a mesh-like structure that is continuously remodeled by polymerization, depolymerization and branching.

Many proteins are involved in the cortex regulation and dynamics including formins with roles in actin polymerization, Arp2/3 complexes that give rise to actin branching and capping proteins. Due to the branching process and the density of the actin cortex, the cortical cytoskeleton can form a highly complex meshwork such as a fractal structure.  Specialized cells are usually characterized by a very specific cortical actin cytoskeleton.  For example, in red blood cells, the cell cortex consists of a two-dimensional cross-linked elastic network with pentagonal or hexagonal symmetry, tethered to the plasma membrane and formed primarily by spectrin, actin and ankyrin. In neuronal axons the actin/spectric cytoskeleton forms an array of periodic rings  and in the sperm flagellum it forms a helical structure.

In plant cells, the cell cortex is reinforced by cortical microtubules underlying the plasma membrane. The direction of these cortical microtubules determines which way the cell elongates when it grows.

Functions 
The cortex mainly functions to produce tension under the cell membrane, allowing the cell to change shape. This is primarily accomplished through myosin II motors, which pull on the filaments to generate stress. These changes in tension are required for the cell to change its shape as it undergoes cell migration and cell division.

In mitosis, F-actin and myosin II form a highly contractile and uniform cortex to drive mitotic cell rounding. The surface tension produced by the actomyosin cortex activity generates intracellular hydrostatic pressure capable of displacing surrounding objects to facilitate rounding.
Thus, the cell cortex serves to protect the microtubule spindle from external mechanical disruption during mitosis. When external forces are applied at sufficiently large rate and magnitude to a mitotic cell, loss of cortical F-actin homogeneity occurs leading to herniation of blebs and a temporary loss of the ability to protect the mitotic spindle. Genetic studies have shown that the cell cortex in mitosis is regulated by diverse genes such as Rhoa, WDR1, ERM proteins, Ect2, Pbl, Cdc42, aPKC, Par6, DJ-1 and FAM134A.

In cytokinesis the cell cortex plays a central role by producing a myosin-rich contractile ring to constrict the dividing cell into two daughter cells.

Cell cortex contractility is key for amoeboidal type cell migration characteristic of many cancer cell metastasis events.

Research 
Basic research into the cell cortex is done with immortalised cell lines, typically HeLa cells, S2 cells, Normal rat kidney cells, and M2 cells. In M2 cells in particular, cellular blebs – which form without a cortex, then form one as they retract – are often used to model cortex formation and composition.

References

Further reading 
 Chapter 6 – Actin and Membranes

Cytoskeleton
Cell biology